Niergui is a sub-prefecture of Guéra Region in Chad.

Demographics 
Ethnic composition by canton in 2016:

Abbassié Canton (population: 8,993; villages: 10):

Bidio Canton (population: 14,062; villages: 63):

Koffa Canton (population: 3,500; villages: 12):

References 

Populated places in Chad